Cricqueville-en-Bessin (literally Cricqueville in Bessin) is a commune in the Calvados department in the Normandy region in northwestern France.

The municipality takes its name from its deep-water creek that forms a natural harbor, from Crycavilla.

History

World War II
Just outside Cricqueville, the United States Army Air Forces established an airfield shortly after D-Day on 9 June 1944, just three days after the Allied landings in France.  The airfield was one of the first established in the liberated area of Normandy.  Known as Advanced Landing Ground "A-2" (Cricqueville), it was used from early June though September 1944. After the Americans moved east into Central France, the airfield was dismantled and the land returned to agricultural use.

Population

See also
 Communes of the Calvados department
 Pointe du Hoc, a point of attack by the United States Army during the Battle of Normandy

References

Communes of Calvados (department)
Calvados communes articles needing translation from French Wikipedia